Saint Bernard (/ˈseɪnt bərˈnɑrd/; Spanish: San Bernardo [ˈsãm ˈbɛɾ.ˈnaɾ.ðo]) is an unincorporated community in St. Bernard Parish, Louisiana, United States.

Saint Bernard is home to four sites on the National Register of Historic Places: the Dr. Louis A. Ducros House, the Kenilworth Plantation House, Magnolia Mound, and the Sebastopol Plantation House.

References

Unincorporated communities in St. Bernard Parish, Louisiana
Unincorporated communities in Louisiana
Unincorporated communities in New Orleans metropolitan area